Henry L. Slobodin was an American attorney, socialist activist and frequent candidate for public office from New York.

Slobodin was active in the Socialist Labor Party of America before leaving in 1899 alongside other socialist activists like Morris Hillquit. Slobodin was National Secretary of the eastern or Rochester branch of the Social Democratic Party of America prior to its merging to create the Socialist Party of America.

References

Year of birth missing
Year of death missing
Socialist Labor Party of America politicians from New York (state)
Social Democratic Party of America politicians
Socialist Party of America politicians from New York (state)
New York (state) lawyers